Marius Văleanu Siminic (born 14 September 1981) is a Romanian former professional footballer who played as a striker.

References

External links
 

1981 births
Living people
Sportspeople from Oradea
Romanian footballers
Association football forwards
Liga I players
Liga II players
FC Bihor Oradea players
ACS Sticla Arieșul Turda players
CF Liberty Oradea players
FC Olimpia Satu Mare players
CSM Unirea Alba Iulia players
CS Pandurii Târgu Jiu players
Nemzeti Bajnokság I players
Diósgyőri VTK players
Romanian expatriate footballers
Expatriate footballers in Hungary
Romanian expatriate sportspeople in Hungary